Lophophelma funebrosa is a moth of the family Geometridae first described by William Warren in 1896. It is found in the north-eastern Himalayas and Sundaland and on Sumbawa. The habitat consists of lowerland forests.

Subspecies
Lophophelma funebrosa funebrosa (north-eastern Himalaya, Sundaland)
Lophophelma funebrosa tenuilinea (Warren, 1899) (Sumbawa)

References

Moths described in 1896
Pseudoterpnini